Botiz may refer to the following places in Romania:

Botiz, a commune in Satu Mare County
Botiz (Lăpuș), a river in Maramureș County, tributary of the Lăpuș
Botiza, a river in Maramureș County, tributary of the Vaser
Botiza (river), a river in Maramureș County, tributary of the Iza